On 9 January 2014, an explosion occurred at a Mitsubishi Materials chemical plant in Yokkaichi, Mie, Japan, killing at least five people and injuring 17 others.

References

Chemical plant explosions
Explosions in 2014
Mitsubishi
Explosions in Japan
2014 industrial disasters
2014 in Japan
Yokkaichi